Tara Cherian (May 1913 - 7 November 2000) was an Indian social activist and politician. She was the first woman mayor of Madras city. The Government of India awarded her the civilian honour of the Padma Bhushan in 1967.

Early life 
Tara was born in May 1913 and graduated from the Madras University. On completion of her studies, Tara plunged into social activism and joined the Guild of Service.

As Mayor 
Like her husband P. V. Cherian, Tara was nominated mayor of Madras in November 1957. She was the first woman to hold the post. Her tenure is notable for the introduction of the mid-day meals scheme in the city.

References 

1913 births
2000 deaths
Mayors of Chennai
Women mayors of places in Tamil Nadu
Recipients of the Padma Bhushan in social work
Activists from Tamil Nadu
Politicians from Chennai
University of Madras alumni
20th-century Indian women politicians
20th-century Indian politicians
Social workers
20th-century Indian educators
Educators from Tamil Nadu
Women educators from Tamil Nadu
Social workers from Tamil Nadu
20th-century women educators